The 8th StarDance series was premiered on October 8, 2016 and ended on December 10, 2016. Hosts in this series are again Marek Eben and Tereza Kostková.

Competitors

References 

8
2016 Czech television seasons